Pac-Man Fever is a 1982 album recorded by Buckner & Garcia. It is also the name of the first song on that album. Each song on the album is about a different classic arcade game, and uses sound effects from that game. The album was originally released in LP, cassette, and 8-track tape formats, and was later completely re-recorded for re-release on CD in 1999 and 2002.

The title song, "Pac-Man Fever", was released as a single in December 1981 and became a top 10 hit, peaking at #9 in March 1982 on the Billboard Hot 100 and earning gold certification by the RIAA for selling over 1 million copies; the single sold 2.5 million copies in total as of 2008. It had been released independently earlier in the year on the BGO Records label, before being picked up by CBS. The album's second single, "Do the Donkey Kong", peaked at #103 on [[Bubbling Under Hot 100 Singles|Billboard'''s Bubbling Under Hot 100 Singles]] chart. Like the title song, the album itself went on to receive a gold certification from the RIAA, for over 500,000 records sold; the album sold 1,200,000 copies in total by the end of 1982. The duo performed both of these singles on American Bandstand on March 20, 1982, as well as appearing later that day on Solid Gold, singing "Pac-Man Fever".

The album was completely rerecorded in 1999 for CD release because the original album is still owned by Columbia and they reportedly declined to release it on CD. When Buckner & Garcia rerecorded "Mousetrap" for this release, they were unable to find a copy of the arcade game anywhere (as it was a rare game from the get-go and had failed due to it being seen as a Pac Man clone), so they recorded the dog and cat sounds at a pet store.

Track listing

Personnel
Gary Garcia: vocals, keyboards, synthesizers, percussion (cowbell)
Jerry Buckner: vocals, keyboards, synthesizers
Mike Stewart: Moog synthesizer on tracks 7 and 8
Chris Bowman, Rick Hinkle: rhythm and lead guitar
Larry McDonald: bass
Ginny Whitaker: drums, percussion
David "Cozy" Cole: electronic drums

"Froggy's Lament" also pays tribute to Smilin' Ed McConnell and Froggy the Gremlin from Andy's Gang'' with its lyrics "Hiya, kids" and "Plunk your magic twanger, Froggy!".

References

External links
Buckner & Garcia

1982 debut albums
Columbia Records albums
Pac-Man
Novelty albums
Albums about video games

de:Buckner & Garcia